The Crying Conch is a Canadian short drama film, directed by Vincent Toi and released in 2017. The film centres on a man who is drawn into a rebellion that parallels the 18th-century story of Haitian revolutionary François Mackandal.

The film premiered at the 2017 Berlin Film Festival, and had its Canadian premiere at the 2017 Toronto International Film Festival. It was subsequently screened at the 2017 Vancouver International Film Festival, where Toi won the award for Most Promising Director of a Canadian Short Film.

The film was named to TIFF's year-end Canada's Top Ten list for short films in 2017.

References

External links

2017 films
2017 short films
Films shot in Haiti
Films set in Haiti
Black Canadian films
Canadian drama short films
2010s Canadian films